Tolbert Percy Dalton (July 3, 1885 – February 17, 1950) was a professional baseball player who played outfield in Major League Baseball from 1910 to 1916. He attended the University of Virginia. He mysteriously vanished on July 4, 1948, from Catonsville, Maryland, while walking to a church service. In March 2012, it was discovered that Dalton had died of a heart ailment in a Pittsburgh hospital in 1950.

In 345 games over four major league seasons, Dalton posted a .286 batting average (333-for-1163) with 167 runs, 39 doubles, 15 triples, 4 home runs, 112 RBIs, 52 stolen bases, 129 bases on balls, .362 on-base percentage and .356 slugging percentage. He finished his career with a .966 fielding percentage playing at all three outfield positions.

References

External links

1885 births
1950 deaths
Major League Baseball outfielders
Brooklyn Superbas players
Brooklyn Dodgers players
Detroit Tigers players
Buffalo Blues players
Des Moines Boosters players
Newark Indians players
Toronto Maple Leafs (International League) players
San Francisco Seals (baseball) players
Virginia Cavaliers baseball players
Baseball players from Tennessee
People from Henderson, Tennessee
People from Catonsville, Maryland